Frederik Conrad Bugge Treschow (31 December 1822 – 22 August 1893) was a Danish publisher.

Early life and education
Treshow was born in Copenhagen, the son of clerk in chatolkassen Andreas Treshow (1794–1846) and Anna Maria Wendel (l) (1797–1864).

Treshow was in 1854 employed at Holmen, first as a copyist and from 1861 as a clerk. He was appointed  as overkrigskommissær in 1869. In 1891 he was appointed as head of the Royal Dockyard's accounting department, a position otherwise reserved for a naval officer. His brother-in-law, justitsråd Erichsen, who was editor of hof- og statskalenderen, introduced him to statistical publications. He published Postadressebog for Kongeriget Danmark in 1869. New editions were published in 1877, 1883 and 1890.

Honors
He was appointed as Overkrigskommissær in 1869 and was awarded the Order of the Dannebrog in 1877.

References 

19th-century Danish publishers (people)
Noble Knights of the Order of the Dannebrog
1822 births
1893 deaths